Stella Van Praagh was a pediatric cardiologist and pathologist at Children's Hospital Boston. She was internationally known for her contributions to the pathology of congenital heart disease.

Early life
Stella Van Praagh was born in Rethymnon, Crete, Greece. She graduated from the School of Medicine at the University of Athens in 1952 and undertook further training in pediatric cardiology at Johns Hopkins where she worked with Helen Taussig.

Career
In 1962, she moved to Children's Hospital of Buffalo as a pediatric cardiologist and research associate. There, she met Richard Van Praagh, and the two were married shortly afterwards, beginning a lifelong personal and professional partnership. In 1965, both Van Praaghs moved to Boston Children's Hospital where they worked until their retirements in 2002.

Accomplishments
Stella and Richard Van Praagh were world-renowned pediatric cardiologists and pathologists. They proposed a new approach to formalize anatomic descriptions of congenital heart disease, which forms the basis of much of the current standard understanding. Specific examples include Truncus Arteriosus, sinus venosus atrial septal defect, and heterotaxy syndrome.

Awards
 Society for Cardiovascular Pathology Distinguished Achievement Award, 1999 
 American Heart Association Paul Dudley White Award, 2004

References

1927 births
2006 deaths
People from Rethymno
National and Kapodistrian University of Athens alumni
Pediatric cardiologists